Aimo Sommarberg (born 11 August 1931) is a Finnish footballer. He played in 15 matches for the Finland national football team from 1952 to 1957.

References

External links
 

1931 births
Living people
Finnish footballers
Finland international footballers
Place of birth missing (living people)
Association footballers not categorized by position
People from Kotka
Sportspeople from Kymenlaakso